Scotomera is a genus of snout moths. It was described by Arthur Gardiner Butler in 1881.

Species
 Scotomera atomalis Amsel, 1949
 Scotomera caesarealis (Ragonot, 1891)
 Scotomera comealis Amsel, 1950
 Scotomera fuliginosalis Leraut, 2007
 Scotomera gnidusalis (Walker, 1859)
 Scotomera kirmanialis Amsel, 1961
 Scotomera laristanalis (Amsel, 1961)
 Scotomera luteocostalis Amsel, 1950
 Scotomera shirazalis (Amsel, 1961)
 Scotomera tacapealis (Ragonot, 1891)

References

Pyralini
Pyralidae genera